Reboul is a surname. Notable people with the surname include:

Duane Reboul (born 1948), American basketball coach
Jean Reboul (1796–1864), French politician and poet
Jean-Baptiste Reboul (1862–1926), French chef
Marie-Thérèse Reboul (1728–1805), French painter and engraver